Isopropylparaben is a paraben.

Synthesis 
Isopropylparaben has been prepared via the stepwise addition of isopropanol, thionyl chloride, and p-hydroxybenzoic acid at low temperature,  followed by heating the reaction mixture.

References

External links
 Final amended report on the safety assessment of Methylparaben, Ethylparaben, Propylparaben, Isopropylparaben, Butylparaben, Isobutylparaben, and Benzylparaben as used in cosmetic products

Cleaning product components
Parabens
Isopropyl esters